Alexandré Pölking (born 12 March 1976), sometimes known simply as Mano, is a Brazilian-German football manager and former player. He is currently the head coach of Thailand national team.

Playing career
He started his career in his ancestral country of Germany, playing for VfB Fichte Bielefeld, Arminia Bielefeld and SV Darmstadt 98. In 2005, he moved to Cyprus where he played for Olympiakos Nicosia and APOEL.

Managerial career
Pölking was the assistant of German manager Winfried Schäfer since 2008 at Al Ain FC and FC Baku. In 2012, Alexandré Pölking came to Thailand to be the assistant of Schäfer who was appointed as the national head coach of Thailand national team in June 2011. In 2013, Pölking was appointed by the Army United as the head coach. He finished his first season as the manager with sixth place at the final standing.

In 2014, Pölking moved to Suphanburi. He was later sacked by the club after 12 games of Thai Premier League. Pölking has become the head coach of Bangkok United in the second leg of a 2014 season. He made the debut for Bangkok United with 3–0 win over his former club Army United on 25 June 2014.

Thailand
Pölking was appointed as the national head coach of Thailand national team, as announced by the Football Association of Thailand (FAT) on 28 September 2021. Pölking replaced Japanese coach Akira Nishino, who was sacked in July after the War Elephants were eliminated in the qualifying round for the 2022 FIFA World Cup. Polking's first task was the 2020 AFF Championship in December 2021. Between 5 December 2021 and 1 January 2022, Polking accomplished the very task as he led the War Elephants to win 6–2 on aggregate after being held to 2–2 second-leg draw by Indonesia's Garuda, making Thailand reign the AFF Championship for the sixth time. In 2022, Pölking managed the Thai side to defend the title in the 2022 AFF Championship as he led the team to win 3-2 on aggregate against Vietnam, Pölking became the fourth manager, after Peter Withe, Radojko Avramović and Kiatisuk Senamuang, to successfully defend the AFF Championship title, the first being on the 2020 edition. In the 2021 Southeast Asian Games, he became manager of U-23 team and he led the team to the men's football final, but lost 0-1 against the host Vietnam.

Managerial statistics

 A win or loss by the penalty shoot-out is regarded as the draw in time.

Honours

Manager
Bangkok United
Thai League 1 runners-up: 2016, 2018
Thai FA Cup runners-up: 2017

Thailand
AFF Championship: 2020, 2022

Thailand U23
2021 Southeast Asian Games:  Silver medal

Individual
Thai League 1 Coach of the Month: April 2016, April 2018, June 2019

References

External links

วิเคราะห์ชัด ๆ : ทำไมทีมชาติไทยต้องใช้ "มาโน่ โพลกิ้ง" ทั้งที่ไม่เคยพาทีมเป็นแชมป์ ? | MAIN STAND

1976 births
Living people
Brazilian footballers
German footballers
Cypriot First Division players
SV Darmstadt 98 players
Olympiakos Nicosia players
APOEL FC players
Brazilian expatriate footballers
Expatriate footballers in Cyprus
Brazilian people of German descent
Brazilian expatriate football managers
German expatriate football managers
Expatriate football managers in the United Arab Emirates
Expatriate football managers in Azerbaijan
Expatriate football managers in Thailand
Alexandre Polking
Alexandre Polking
Alexandre Polking
Association football wingers